Stefan Schneider (born December 13, 1989) is a Canadian former professional ice hockey player who played three seasons of professional ice hockey in the American Hockey League (AHL) and ECHL. He last played for the Peoria Rivermen in the AHL.

Schneider played major junior hockey in the Western Hockey League where he scored 43 points in 175 games played.

On March 29, 2010, the Vancouver Canucks of the National Hockey League signed Schneider as a free agent to an entry level contract.

Career statistics

References

External links
 

1989 births
Canadian ice hockey right wingers
Chicago Wolves players
Ice hockey people from British Columbia
Kalamazoo Wings (ECHL) players
Living people
Manitoba Moose players
Peoria Rivermen (AHL) players
Portland Winterhawks players
Sportspeople from Vernon, British Columbia
Vancouver Giants players
Vernon Vipers players